"Austere" is the debut single by Welsh alternative rock band The Joy Formidable. It was originally released in August 2008 on 7" vinyl on the Another Music=Another Kitchen label. The song and band gained much exposure when YouTube removed a fan-made music video. An official video was put together featuring the band playing pass the parcel. The single was re-released for their debut album The Big Roar and a new video was made, featuring the band performing the song.

In a short review of the track The Times described it as "dreamy indie pop", and the track appeared in trailers for SSX (2012 video game) as well as Channel 4's Skins.

Track listing 
Original
Austere

Re-release
Austere
Austere (Oh Matt Thomas Bamalam Remix)

Personnel 
2009 version
Ritzy Bryan - Vocals, Guitar
Rhydian Dafydd - Bass
Justin Stahley - Drums

2011 version
Ritzy Bryan - Vocals, Guitar
Rhydian Dafydd - Bass
Matt Thomas - Drums

References 

2008 debut singles
2011 singles
The Joy Formidable songs
2008 songs
Atlantic Records singles